Kasatka (1976 – August 15, 2017) was a wild caught female orca who lived at SeaWorld San Diego.

Life

Kasatka was captured off the southeastern coast of Iceland on October 26, 1978 with another young female whale named Kahana. Both were estimated to be around 2 years old. The two whales were housed in a sea pen in Grindavík before being shipped to SeaWorld later that year. 

Kasatka showed occasional aggression to humans. In 1993, she tried to bite trainer Ken Peters during a show, and again in 1999. On November 30, 2006, Kasatka grabbed Peters again and dragged him underwater twice during their show. Peters survived with minor injuries.

After suffering incurable pneumonia from 2008 to 2017, Kasatka was euthanized at age 40 on August 15, 2017.

Offspring
Kasatka was the matriarch of the San Diego Orca SeaWorld family.  She was the first captive cetacean to successively receive artificial insemination, according to John Hargrove, a trainer there.

She bore two daughters and two sons, resulting in six grandchildren and two great-grandchildren by the time of her death: 
Takara (born 1991), female (SeaWorld San Antonio)
Kohana (born  May 3, 2002 - September 14, 2022), female (Loro Parque)
 Adán (born October 13, 2010), male (Loro Parque)
 Victoria ("Vicky") (August 3, 2012 – June 16, 2013), female (Loro Parque)
Trua (November 23, 2005), male (SeaWorld Orlando)
Sakari (January 7, 2010), female (SeaWorld San Antonio)
Kamea (December 6, 2013), female (SeaWorld San Antonio)
Kyara (April 19, 2017 – July 24, 2017), female (SeaWorld San Antonio)
Nakai (born September 1, 2001 - August 5, 2022), male (Seaworld San Diego); first orca conceived by artificial insemination
Kalia (born December 21, 2004), female (SeaWorld San Diego)  
Amaya (born December 2, 2014 – August 19, 2021), female (SeaWorld San Diego) 
Makani (born February 14, 2013), male (SeaWorld San Diego)

See also
 List of individual cetaceans
 List of captive orcas
 Captive killer whales
 Killer whale attacks on humans
 Keiko, the star of the 1993 movie Free Willy

References

External links
 SeaWorld

1976 animal births
2017 animal deaths
Individual orcas
Individual animals in the United States